Baravat (also Romanized as Baravāt and Barvat; also known as Borūnābād and Burābād) is a city in the Central District of Bam County, Kerman Province, Iran.  At the 2006 census, its population was 15,388, in 3,950 families.

References

Populated places in Bam County

Cities in Kerman Province